Minuscule 48 (in the Gregory-Aland numbering), A232 (von Soden), is a Greek minuscule manuscript of the New Testament, on parchment leaves. Palaeographically it has been assigned to the 12th century. It has complex contents with some marginalia.

Description 

The codex contains the complete text of the four Gospels on 145 leaves (size ) with a commentary. The text is written in two columns per page, 30 lines per page.

It has errors with iota subscriptum.

Text 

Kurt Aland the Greek text of the codex did not place in any Category. It was not examined by using the Claremont Profile Method.
In result the textual character of the codex is unknown.

History 

The manuscript was dated by Scholz the 13th and by Gregory to the 12th century. Currently it has been assigned by the INTF to the 12th century.

The manuscript was used by Mill (as Bodl. 7). Scholz dated the manuscript to the 13th century. Currently it is dated by the INTF to the 12th century.

It was added to the list of the New Testament manuscripts by J. J. Wettstein. C. R. Gregory saw it in 1883.

It is currently housed at the Bodleian Library (MS. Auct.D.2.17), at Oxford.

See also 
 List of New Testament minuscules
 Biblical manuscript
 Textual criticism

References

Further reading 

 

Greek New Testament minuscules
12th-century biblical manuscripts
Bodleian Library collection